Charles Dickens (1812–1870) was an English writer and social critic.

Dickens may also refer to:

People
Dickens (surname)
Dickens family, descendants of John Dickens, including his son Charles Dickens

Places

 Dickens (crater), a crater on Mercury

Canada
Dickens, Vancouver, British Columbia, a small neighbourhood in East Vancouver

United Kingdom
Dickens Heath, village in the borough of Solihull, West Midlands

United States
Dickens, Iowa (population 202 at the 2000 census), a city in Clay County
Dickens, Maryland, an unincorporated community in Allegany County
Dickens, Missouri, an unincorporated community
Dickens, Nebraska, an unincorporated community in Lincoln County
Dickens, Texas (population 332 at the 2000 census), a city in Dickens County
Dickens County, Texas (population 2,762 at the 2000 census)

Arts, entertainment, and media
Dickens (TV miniseries), 2002 PBS miniseries
Dickens in America, 2005 BBC television documentary
 Dickensian (TV series), 2016 BBC drama that brings together characters created by Charles Dickens in a Victorian community

Education
Charles Dickens Elementary School, public elementary school in Vancouver, Canada
Dickens Annex, public elementary school in Vancouver, Canada
Dickens Hall, historical building at Kansas State University in Manhattan, U.S.

Entertainment venues
Dickens Athletic Center, 2,500-seat multi-purpose arena in Chicago, U.S.
Dickens World, themed attraction located at Chatham Dockyard, Kent, UK
Dickens on the Strand, annual Christmas festival in Galveston, Texas, U.S.

Other uses
USS Dickens (APA-161), U.S. Navy attack transport during WW2

See also
Dickins (disambiguation)